Roman Richard Atkielski (August 5, 1899 – June 30, 1969) was a Roman Catholic auxiliary bishop of the Roman Catholic Archdiocese of Milwaukee serving from 1947 until 1969.

Biography
Born in Milwaukee, Wisconsin, the son of Frank and Catherine Atkielski, Roman worked as a cutter at a fur factory before his ordination.

Atkielski was ordained to the priesthood on May 30, 1930. On August 2, 1947, Pope Pius XII appointed Atkielski bishop, and he was consecrated bishop on August 28, 1947. He was also the titular bishop of Stobi.

Bishop Atkielski was in office until his death.

References

Religious leaders from Milwaukee
1899 births
1969 deaths
20th-century Roman Catholic bishops in the United States
Roman Catholic Archdiocese of Milwaukee